Bioskop Fox is the seventh studio album by the Serbian rock band Smak, released in 1995.

Track listing

Personnel 
 Dejan Najdanović - vocals
 Radomir Mihajlović "Točak" - guitar
 Milan Milosavljević - guitar
 Vlada Samardžić - bass
 Slobodan Stojanović "Kepa" - drums
 Dejan Stojanović - drums

External links

Smak albums
1995 albums
Serbian-language albums